Eurytium is a genus of crab in the family Panopeidae, containing the following species:
Eurytium affine  (Streets & Kingsley, 1877)
Eurytium albidigitum Rathbun, 1933
Eurytium limosum (Say, 1818)
Eurytium tristani Rathbun, 1906

References

Xanthoidea